Alex Hua Tian  (born 25 October 1989) is an equestrian sportsman who competes in eventing for China.

Early life
Hua Tian was born in London to a Chinese father and a British mother. He has a brother, called Jamie Hua Ming. The family lived in Beijing, before moving to Hong Kong. Hua started riding aged four. His family moved to Wiltshire when he was 11, where Hua attended Chafyn Grove School followed by Eton College.

Career
Hua was the only Chinese event rider competing internationally between 2006 and 2016 and the first Chinese to be registered with International Federation for Equestrian Sports.  He took a year out of his studies at Eton to prepare for the 2008 Olympics in Beijing. He qualified four horses between October 2007 and May 2008. Although as a host nation competitor he only needed to achieve a minimum standard, he qualified in his own right through the rankings as the youngest ever Olympic event rider. In mid-2008 he achieved a ranking of 21st in the world. The equestrian industry in China has grown since the 2008 Olympics in Beijing to be the 3rd largest leisure pursuit among the elite in China.

He was coached by the former world champion Clayton Fredericks and his wife Lucinda Fredericks, who won the Burghley Horse Trials 2006 and Badminton Horse Trials 2007, at their base in Wiltshire, and by Jane Gregory, British Olympic Dressage Team 1996 and 2008.

Having returned to Eton to complete his studies, Hua won a place at Bristol University to study Aerotechnology Engineering, which he postponed for three years to concentrate on working toward competing in London 2012. At the 2009, Blenheim International Horse Trials, Hua won the Best under-25 Prize and qualified for the World Equestrian Games in Lexington, September 2010. In November 2009, he won the inaugural HSBC Rising Star Award, presented to him in Copenhagen by Princess Haya, President of the International Equestrian Federation at the 'Oscars of Equestrian Sport'.

In 2014, Hua won a silver medal at the Incheon Asian Games riding Temujin, owned by Edwina Qu Ye.

Hua qualified for the 2016 Summer Olympics in Rio with horses Harbour Pilot C and Don Geniro. He placed 8th with Don Geniro.

In 2018 he won a bronze medal at the Jakarta Asian Games riding PSH Convivial.

In 2019 he was a member of the first Chinese eventing team to qualify for the 2020 Summer Olympics.

See also 
 China at the 2008 Summer Olympics

References

Further reading

 Eton schoolboy holds Chinese Olympic dream Sunday Telegraph, 10 September 2007
 Alex Hua Tian saddled with hopes of the host nation at Olympic Games Matthew Pinsent, The Times, 2 August 2008
 Olympics Equestrian Hopes dashed, Hua Tian plots for London Reuters, 12 August 2008
 China's medal hopes rest on youngster Universal Sports (Reuters), 30 July 2008
 China's Olympic equestrian team to be led by Eton schoolboy. Reuters TV report, 30 July 2008
 Alex Hua Tian from China rides Chico USA Today, 9 August 2008
 Beijing 2008 Olympic Profile

External links

 
 
 
 Alex Hua Tian saddles up for date with destiny China Daily, 3 March 2008
 Alex Hua Tian CCTV5 short documentary
 Eton schoolboy gallops toward Beijing Games China Daily, 22 August 2007
 Team China 2008 Press Photos Photo Collection
 China's Olympic riding hope is Eton schoolboy The Observer, 4 May 2008
 A Horse of a Different Colour Wall Street Journal, 11 August 2008

1989 births
Living people
Chinese male equestrians
Chinese people of English descent
Event riders
People educated at Eton College
People educated at Chafyn Grove School
Equestrians at the 2008 Summer Olympics
Equestrians at the 2016 Summer Olympics
Olympic equestrians of China
English people of Chinese descent
English male equestrians
Sportspeople from London
Equestrians at the 2014 Asian Games
Equestrians at the 2018 Asian Games
Asian Games silver medalists for China
Asian Games bronze medalists for China
Asian Games medalists in equestrian
Medalists at the 2014 Asian Games
Medalists at the 2018 Asian Games
Equestrians at the 2020 Summer Olympics